The Yemeni trident leaf-nosed bat (Triaenops parvus) is a species of bat found in the Middle East.

Taxonomy and etymology
It was described as a new species in 2009 by Benda and Vallo.
Before this, it had been considered synonymous with the rufous trident bat.
Its species name "parvus" is Latin for "small," chosen because of its extraordinarily small size compared to other species in its genus.

Description
It is the smallest member of its genus.
Its fur is beige or brownish-gray in color.

Range and habitat
It has been documented in Yemen and Oman.

Conservation
As of 2017, it is evaluated as a data deficient species by the IUCN.
It meets the criteria for this classification because there is inadequate data on its geographic range and biology.
However, its known range is restricted.

References

Bats of Asia
Mammals described in 2009
Triaenops